Haji Malak Jamroz Khan (1878–1963) was a leader of Yusufzai Pashtun in Swat district of Khyber-Pakhtunkhwa. He was the only son of Malak Amir Ullah Khan (Mehrullah Khan) of Bara Bandai, Chief of Ashakhel Yousafzai.

Haji Malak Jamroz Khan was a well-known leader of the Niamatkhel clan of Yousafzai Pashtuns. Malik Jamroz Khan was from the Kanju village of Swat. Malik Jamroz Khan was a well-respected individual who worked for the well being of the people of his area.

Haji Malak Jamroz Khan known as Shad Dada was among those few elders of Swat who formed the former princely State of Swat. Malik Jamroz Khan had two sons Haji Malak Abdul Akbar Khan Lala (1907–1993) and Haji Malak Nawsherawan Khan.

Swat State was a prosperous state with a High School in almost every village of the state, roads and other infrastructure and excellent judicial and administrative set-up. Haji Malak Jamroz Khan, as a person and Malik, is still remembered as a pious, brave and honest person.

References 

Pashtun people
1878 births
1963 deaths